DXAQ (1404 AM) was a radio station owned and operated by Sonshine Media Network International. It formerly served as the radio arm of the Kingdom of Jesus Christ from its inception in 1989 to 2010, when it permanently went off the air, with some of its programs absorbed by sister station DXRD.

References

Radio stations established in 1989
Radio stations disestablished in 2010
Radio stations in Davao City
Sonshine Media Network International
News and talk radio stations in the Philippines
Defunct radio stations in the Philippines